Opponitz is a town in the district of Amstetten in Lower Austria in Austria.

Geography
Opponitz lies on the Ybbs River in the Mostviertel in Lower Austria. About 72.52 percent of the municipality is forested.

References

Cities and towns in Amstetten District